The Graphical Kernel System (GKS) was the first ISO standard for low-level computer graphics, introduced in 1977. A draft international standard was circulated for review in September 1983.
Final ratification of the standard was achieved in 1985.

Overview
GKS provides a set of drawing features for two-dimensional vector graphics suitable for charting and similar duties. The calls are designed to be portable across different programming languages, graphics devices and hardware, so that applications written to use GKS will be readily portable to many platforms and devices.

GKS was fairly common on computer workstations in the 1980s and early 1990s.
GKS formed the basis of Digital Research's GSX and GEM products; the latter was common on the Atari ST and was occasionally seen on PCs particularly in conjunction with Ventura Publisher. It was little used commercially outside these markets, but remains in use in some scientific visualization packages. It is also the underlying API defining the Computer Graphics Metafile. A descendant of GKS was PHIGS. One popular application based on an implementation of GKS is the GR Framework, a C library for high-performance scientific visualization that has become a common plotting backend among Julia users.

A main developer and promoter of the GKS was José Luis Encarnação, formerly director of the Fraunhofer Institute for Computer Graphics (IGD) in Darmstadt, Germany.

GKS has been standardized in the following documents:
 ANSI standard ANSI X3.124 of 1985.
 ISO 7942:1985 standard, revised as ISO 7942:1985/Amd 1:1991 and ISO/IEC 7942-1:1994, as well as ISO/IEC 7942-2:1997, ISO/IEC 7942-3:1999 and ISO/IEC 7942-4:1998
 The language bindings are ISO standard ISO 8651.
 GKS-3D (Graphical Kernel System for Three Dimensions) functional definition is ISO standard ISO 8805, and the corresponding C bindings are ISO/IEC 8806.

The functionality of GKS is wrapped up as a data model standard in the STEP standard, section ISO 10303-46.

See also 
 General Graphics Interface
 GSS-KERNEL
 IGES (Initial Graphics Exchange Specification)
 NAPLPS

References

Further reading

External links 
 Unofficial source of current implementation information
 GKS at FOLDOC

Computer graphics
Application programming interfaces
Graphics standards
Graphical Kernel System